Óscar Héctor Quintabani Faggionali (born 4 June 1950) is an Argentine football manager and former player who played as a goalkeeper. He is the current manager of Deportes Quindío.

Playing career
Quintabani began his playing career in the River Plate youth system, although he never made his breakthrough into the first team. He went on to play for Argentinos Juniors before continuing his career in Colombia with Once Caldas, Deportes Tolima, and Deportivo Pereira.

Managerial career
After retiring as a player Quintabani took up coaching. He was manager of Deportivo Pereira, Deportes Quindío and Cortuluá in Colombia, then Deportivo Quito in Ecuador.

In 2006, he was appointed manager of Deportivo Pasto, he led the team to their first ever Colombian league championship in the Apertura 2006 championship. He then signed for Atlético Nacional where he won back-to-back championships in the Apertura and Clausura 2007 tournaments.

In May 2008 he quit as manager of Nacional to take over at Millonarios.

Managerial titles

References

External links
 Quintabani joins Millonarios

1950 births
Living people
Naturalized citizens of Colombia
Argentine emigrants to Colombia
Footballers from Buenos Aires
Argentine footballers
Association football goalkeepers
Argentine Primera División players
Argentinos Juniors footballers
Once Caldas footballers
Deportes Tolima footballers
Deportivo Pereira footballers
Argentine football managers
Colombian footballers
Colombian football managers
Deportivo Pereira managers
Deportes Quindío managers
Deportivo Cali managers
S.D. Quito managers
Deportivo Pasto managers
Atlético Nacional managers
Millonarios F.C. managers
Atlético Junior managers
Cúcuta Deportivo managers
Deportes Tolima managers
Águilas Doradas Rionegro managers